In algebra, the Binet–Cauchy identity, named after Jacques Philippe Marie Binet and Augustin-Louis Cauchy, states that

for every choice of real or complex numbers (or more generally, elements of a commutative ring).
The Binet-Cauchy identity is a special case of the Cauchy–Binet formula for matrix determinants.

The Binet–Cauchy identity and exterior algebra
When , the first and second terms on the right hand side become the squared magnitudes of dot and cross products respectively; in  dimensions these become the magnitudes of the dot and wedge products. We may write it

It may also be written as a formula giving the dot product of two wedge products, as 

which can be written as 

in the  case.

where  is the angle between the vectors.

This is a special case of the inner product on the exterior algebra of a vector space, which is defined on wedge-decomposable elements as the Gram determinant of their components.

Einstein notation
A relationship between the Levi–Cevita symbols and the generalized Kronecker delta is

The  form of the Binet–Cauchy identity can be written as

Proof
Expanding the last term,

where the second and fourth terms are the same and artificially added to complete the sums as follows:

This completes the proof after factoring out the terms indexed by i.

Generalization
A general form, also known as the Cauchy–Binet formula, states the following:
Suppose A is an m×n matrix and B is an n×m matrix. If S is a subset of {1, ..., n} with m elements, we write AS for the m×m matrix whose columns are those columns of A that have indices from S. Similarly, we write BS for the m×m matrix whose rows are those rows of B that have indices from S. 
Then the determinant of the matrix product of A and B satisfies the identity

where the sum extends over all possible subsets S of  {1, ..., n} with m elements.

We get the original identity as special case by setting

Notes

References

Mathematical identities
Multilinear algebra
Articles containing proofs